Annemarie Pawlik (1 June 1938 – 9 May 2019) was an Austrian politician who was a member of the National Council in 1990.

Life 

Pawlik was born in Wolfsberg, Carinthia in 1938. From 1979 – 1990 she was a municipal councillor in Klagenfurt. From 6 June until 4 November 1990 she was a member of the Austrian National Council, representing the Social Democratic Party of Austria (SPÖ). She returned to Klagenfurt as city councillor for housing assignment, social and family affairs.

In 2019, Pawlik died at the age of 80.

References

External links 
 
 Obituary 

1938 births
2019 deaths
People from Wolfsberg
Members of the National Council (Austria)
20th-century Austrian politicians
20th-century Austrian women politicians
Social Democratic Party of Austria politicians
Women local politicians
Austrian city councillors